The modern pentathlon is an Olympic sport consisting of fencing (one-touch épée), freestyle swimming, equestrian show jumping, pistol shooting, and cross country running. The event is inspired by the traditional pentathlon held during the ancient Olympics. The modern pentathlon was first held in 1912, and its rules have changed several times over the years. The latest structure, as of the 2020 Olympics, consists of three separate events for fencing, swimming, and equestrian, which determine each athlete's starting time in the final event. The last event, called the laser-run, alternates four legs of laser pistol shooting followed by an 800 m run (for 3200 m in total).

The sport has been a feature of the Summer Olympic Games since 1912, despite several attempts to remove it. A world championships for modern pentathlon has been held annually since 1949.

The governing body, Union Internationale de Pentathlon Moderne (UIPM), administers the international sport in more than 90 countries.

Format 
The format of the modern pentathlon has changed frequently through the sport's history. Described below is the format used in the Tokyo 2020 Olympics:

 Fencing: Two rounds of fencing are done, both with electric épées. In the first round, each athlete fences against each other athlete in a bout lasting one minute or until the first hit; if a bout goes to time both athletes are marked as losing it. More points are scored for each victory – for example, an athlete who wins 70 percent of their bouts receives 250 points. In the second round (seeded by results in the first round), the time limit is reduced to 45 seconds, and losing a bout eliminates them from this round. Again, points are scored for winning each bout.
 Swimming: This is a single 200 meter freestyle swim. A time of 2 minutes 30 seconds scores 250 points, with faster times scoring more and slower times less.
 Riding: Athletes attempt a show-jumping course with 12 obstacles. Athletes do not bring a horse to the event; they are assigned an unfamiliar horse and have 20 minutes to practice with the animal. Completing the course scores 300 points with points deducted for penalties.
 Combined running and shooting: At this final event, athletes' starting times are determined by their total scores from the first three events. The highest scorer starts first. Each successive athlete then starts with a delay of one second for each point by which they trail the leader. Athletes run 3200 meters, stopping four times to shoot at targets with a laser pistol. Each round, they must remain at the target until scoring five hits (with an unlimited number of shots) or until 50 seconds have elapsed. Final placement in the overall modern pentathlon is determined by order across the finish line.

History

Creation 
Most sources state that the creator of the modern pentathlon was Baron Pierre de Coubertin, the founder of the modern Olympic Games. However, researcher Sandra Heck concluded that Viktor Balck, the President of the Organizing Committee for the 1912 Games, made use of the long tradition of Swedish military multi-sports events to create the modern pentathlon.

The name derives from the Greek péntathlon "contest of five events". The addition of modern to the name distinguishes it from the original pentathlon of the ancient Olympic Games, which consisted of the stadion foot race, wrestling, long jump, javelin, and discus. As the events of the ancient pentathlon were modeled after the skills of the ideal soldier to defend a fortification of that time, Coubertin created the contest to simulate the experience of a 19th-century cavalry soldier behind enemy lines: he must ride an unfamiliar horse, fight enemies with pistol and sword, swim, and run to return to his own soldiers. Originally, only amateur competitors, i.e. upper-class cavalry officers, were allowed to compete in the modern pentathlon at the Olympics. In the 1912 Games, as only amateur officers competed, the competitors were permitted to use their own horses. Up to the 1952 Olympics the ordinary cavalry soldier was considered a professional athlete, as he was riding and training horses for a living, and as such unable to participate, while the officer was considered the amateur and therefore allowed to compete.

Olympic Games 
The event was first held at the 1912 Olympic Games and has been on the Olympic program continuously since 1912. Modern pentathlon, despite its long Olympic history, has had to justify its inclusion in the modern Olympic Games several times. On February 11, 2013, in Lausanne, the IOC confirmed modern pentathlon once again as one of the 25 core sports of the Olympic program through to 2020.

A team event was added to the Olympic Games in 1952 and discontinued in 1992. An event for women was added to the Olympic Games in 2000.

Originally, the competition took place over four or five days. In 1996, a one-day format was adopted in an effort to be more audience-friendly. To enhance the experience for spectators, the UIPM proposed that all five events should be held in a single venue. This was planned for the 2016 Summer Olympics but held for the first time at the 2020 Summer Olympics. For the 2024 Summer Olympics, a condensed format of 90 minutes with eliminations is planned.
 
Modern pentathlon is also part of the Youth Olympic Games since 2010.

Governance 
As long as there was no official international federation for Modern Pentathlon an IOC committee was set up for the sport making use of the expertise of IOC members. The governing body, Union Internationale de Pentathlon Moderne (UIPM) was founded in 1948.

International competitions  

A world championship has been held every year since 1949. The competitions include men and women's individual and team events together with relay events for men and women and, since 2010, a mixed relay event.
After much lobby work of the president of the German Modern Pentathlon Federation, Wilhelm Henze, women were for the first time admitted at the world championships in 1977, and at the official world championships in 1981.

The Modern Pentathlon World Cup is an annual series of modern pentathlon competitions. The first was held in 1999.

Format changes over time 
Modern pentathlon has been the subject of numerous changes since its creation.

Fencing 
In 2015 — and for the first time in the 2016 Summer Olympics — a system of an additional bonus round was added to épée fencing in international competitions. Before that, there was only the round-robin format.

Swimming 
Until the 2000 Olympics, the distance for swimming was 300 metres; at that time it was changed to 200 metres.

Riding 
The distance of the cross-country riding event was reduced from 5 km to 4 km in 1972. For the 1988 Summer Olympics cross-country riding was changed to show jumping.

Shooting and running 
From 1912 to 1988 regular pistols or later sport pistols were used for shooting. From 1989 until 2009, the shooting discipline involved firing a 4.5 mm (.177 cal) air pistol in the standing position from 10 metres distance at a stationary target. The format was that of the 10 metre air pistol competition: each competitor had 20 shots, with 40 seconds allowed for each shot. Beginning with the World Cup events in 2011, laser pistols were used instead of pistols with actual projectiles. There is a slight delay between the trigger pull and the laser firing, simulating the time it would take for a pellet to clear the muzzle. Air pistols with laser transmitters were introduced during the transitional period and are still in use. Purpose-built laser pistols are developed and commonly used since the middle of the 2010s. Laser pistols and targets have to be homologated by the UIPM.

Until the 2000 Olympics, the running distance was 4 kilometres. The running discipline was shortened to a 3 km cross-country run afterwards.

In 2009, the running and shooting events were combined into three 1000 m laps with each preceded by laser shooting at five targets in 70 seconds or less. From the start of the 2013 season, the laser-run was changed to consist of four 800 m laps (increasing the distance to 3.2 kilometres) each preceded by laser shooting at five targets in 50 seconds or less. This change was intended to restore some of the importance of the shooting skill felt to have been lost in the original 2009 combined event.

Overall scoring and operation 
Scoring was originally done by a points-for-place system with the lowest score winning. Since the 1954 World Cup points tables are used for each of the five events and points are added for the final score. This scoring was first used in the 1956 Summer Olympics. The five disciplines were held on a single day — instead of four to six — from the 1996 Summer Olympics onwards.

Proposed replacement of riding 
The riding discipline attracted criticism during the 2020 Summer Olympics after multiple athletes in the women's event struggled to control their randomly-assigned horses. This culminated in the German team's coach, Kim Raisner, being removed from the event after striking a horse with her fist. Following the Games, in November 2021 it was reported that the UIPM was opening consultations on the proposed replacement of riding with another discipline. The decision was ratified during the UIPM's congress on 27 November 2021, with the changes intended to be implemented for the 2028 Summer Olympics.

The decision was met with criticism from various athletes and bodies, who considered riding to be integral to Modern pentathlon. Some also accused the UIPM of hindering debate in favour of riding during the congress. More than 650 modern pentathletes signed a letter calling for the UIPM executive board to resign. A group known as "Pentathlon United" called for the IOC to investigate the UIPM's governance, and proposed a plan to maintain riding with rule changes to bring them in line with those of the International Federation for Equestrian Sports (FEI), and a focus on animal welfare.

In May 2022, the UIPM announced it would hold an obstacle racing test event alongside the 2022 Modern Pentathlon World Cup final in Ankara, citing that it had received the most support out of the over 60 disciplines proposed, was more cost-effective, would help make the event more attractive to a younger audience, and was "compatible with the DNA of modern pentathlon." The competition course was developed with input from World Obstacle, and the event featured a mix of athletes from both the obstacle racing and modern pentathlon communities.

Criticism 
Modern pentathlon's inclusion in the Summer Olympics has frequently been criticised for being obscure, unpopular, and complex, especially as the IOC limits each Summer Olympics to 28 disciplines.

The switch to a one-day format in the 1990s was criticised for changing the steady character of modern pentathlon to a more fast-paced competition.

The laser-run has been criticized as altering too radically the nature of the skills required. The New York Times asked whether the name ought to be changed to "tetrathlon" given that two of the five disciplines had been combined into a single event.

See also 
 Pentathlon
 List of Olympic medalists in modern pentathlon
 Modern pentathlon at the Summer Olympics
 World Modern Pentathlon Championships

References 

Notes

External links 

 Lasers make modern pentathlon more modern

 
Multisports
Summer Olympic sports
Individual sports
Fencing
Cross country running
Shooting sports
Show jumping
Swimming
Military sports
Pentathlon